Zuppa pavese ('Pavia soup') or zuppa alla Pavese ('Pavia-style soup') is an Italian soup consisting of broth into which slices of stale bread and poached eggs are placed. It is generally served with grated Parmigiano Reggiano. Usually in Lombardy either Grana Padano or Granone Lodigiano are used.

See also
 List of soups

Notes

Italian soups
Bread soups
Culture in Pavia